The 1969 Pau Grand Prix was a Formula Two motor race held on 20 April 1969 at the Pau circuit, in Pau, Pyrénées-Atlantiques, France. The Grand Prix was won by Jochen Rindt, driving the Lotus 59B. Jean-Pierre Beltoise finished second and Piers Courage third.

Classification

Race

References

Pau Grand Prix
1969 in French motorsport